Miles Davis & Gil Evans: The Complete Columbia Studio Recordings is a box set of music by jazz musicians Miles Davis and Gil Evans originally released on CD in 1996 and remastered and re-released in 2004.  It collects work from 1957 through 1968 at Columbia Records recording studios.

Miles Davis and Gil Evans had worked together on Davis's landmark 1949 album Birth of the Cool.  Evans was a distinguished soloist, but it was his role as arranger that is well-illustrated here with alternate and working takes.

Track listing

Disc 1 - Miles Ahead

Disc 2 - Porgy and Bess

Disc 3 - Sketches of Spain

Disc 4 - Quiet Nights and More

Disc 5 - The Making of Miles Ahead

Disc 6 - Alternate and Rehearsal Takes

Personnel 

Miles Davis - trumpet, flugelhorn
Gil Evans - piano, arranger, conductor
Bob Dorough (vocals, piano)
Steve Lacy (soprano saxophone)
Lee Konitz, Cannonball Adderley (alto saxophone)
Wayne Shorter (tenor saxophone)
Ernie Royal, Bernie Glow, James Jorda, John Carisi, Louis Mucci (trumpet)
Jimmy Cleveland, J.J. Johnson, Frank Rehak, Joe Bennett, Tom Mitchell (trombone)
Julius Watkins, Gunther Schuller, Willie Ruff, Tony Miranda, Jim Buffington (French horn)
Bill Barber (tuba)
Romeo Penque (flute, clarinet, bass clarinet, oboe)
Hubert Laws (flute)
Jack Knitzer (bassoon)
Janet Putnam (harp)
Wynton Kelly (piano)
Herbie Hancock (piano, electric piano)
Joe Beck (electric guitar)
Paul Chambers, Ron Carter (bass)
Art Taylor, Philly Joe Jones, Jimmy Cobb, Tony Williams (drums)
Willie Bobo (bongos)
Elvin Jones (percussion)

References

External links
 Miles Ahead: A Miles Davis Website

Gil Evans albums
Miles Davis compilation albums
1996 compilation albums
Albums recorded at CBS 30th Street Studio